Tezer Taşkıran (1907 – 4 May 1979) was a Turkish–Azerbaijani writer, politician and teacher.

Early life 
She was born in 1907 in Shusha. Her father was Ahmet Ağaoğlu, a prominent Azerbaijani and later Turkish politician of the early 20th century. and his mother was Sitare Hanım.

After the fall of the Azerbaijan Democratic Republic in 1920, the Ağaoğlus moved to Turkey where Tezer graduated from Faculty of Literature of Istanbul University in 1925.

She married surgeon Nimet Taşkıran in 1931 and traveled to Vienna; she returned to Turkey in 1933.

Family 
Her father Ahmet Ağaoğlu was a prominent Azerbaijani and naturalized Turkish politician, publicist and journalist. He was one of the founders of Pan-Turkism. Her sister Süreyya Ağaoğlu was a writer, jurist, and the first female lawyer in Turkish history. Her brother Samet Ağaoğlu was a poet and politician. Samet's wife, Neriman Ağaoğlu was also a politician.

Career 
After graduating from university, she worked as a teacher and became the first woman to be appointed director of a boys' school in Turkey. She became one of the founding members of the Helpers Association founded in 1928. She was the president of the Turkish University Women Association.

She was elected to the parliament from Kastamonu in 1943, and from Kars in 1946 and 1950.

Works 
 Logic, 1928
 Suri and Applied Logic, 1929
 Stuart Mill, 1931
 Principles of Turkish Ethics, 1934
 Dormitory Information, 1939
 The Citizen's Handbook, 1971
 Turkish Women's Rights on the 50th Anniversary of the Republic, 1973

See also 
 Abbas Ali Çetin

References

External links

1907 births
1979 deaths
Writers from Shusha
People from Elizavetpol Governorate
Turkish people of Azerbaijani descent
Soviet emigrants to Turkey
20th-century Turkish women writers
20th-century Turkish writers
Burials at Feriköy Cemetery
Deputies of Kastamonu
Deputies of Kars
Members of the 7th Parliament of Turkey
Members of the 8th Parliament of Turkey
Members of the 9th Parliament of Turkey
Ağaoğlu family